The 1974–75 Houston Aeros season was the Aeros' third season of operation in the World Hockey Association (WHA). The Aeros qualified first in their division for the playoffs and successfully defended their Avco World Trophy WHA championship.

Regular season
Larry Lund scored 33 goals and had 108 points on the season. Frank Hughes scored a team high 48 goals. Gordie Howe (at the age of 46) scored 34 goals and had 99 points. Mark Howe had 36 goals and 76 points while Marty Howe had 13 goals and 34 points. In total, the Howe family had 83 goals and 209 points combined during the season. The Aeros ranked first in goals scored and goals against en route to 53 wins, a five-game improvement from their Cup winning season the year before.

Final standings

Game log

Playoffs
During the playoffs, the Aeros lost only once en route to a second consecutive Avco World Trophy. The Aeros defeated the Cleveland Crusaders 4–1 in the Quarter-finals. The Aeros then defeated the San Diego Mariners 4–0 to advance to the Final. In the Final, the Aeros swept the Quebec Nordiques 4–0.

Houston Aeros 4, Cleveland Crusaders 1 - Quarterfinals

Houston Aeros 4, San Diego Mariners 0 - Semifinals

Houston Aeros 4, Quebec Nordiques 0 - Avco Cup Finals

Player stats

Note: Pos = Position; GP = Games played; G = Goals; A = Assists; Pts = Points; +/- = plus/minus; PIM = Penalty minutes; PPG = Power-play goals; SHG = Short-handed goals; GWG = Game-winning goals
      MIN = Minutes played; W = Wins; L = Losses; T = Ties; GA = Goals-against; GAA = Goals-against average; SO = Shutouts;

Awards and records

Transactions

Draft picks
Houston's draft picks at the 1974 WHA Amateur Draft.

Farm teams

See also
1974–75 WHA season

References

External links

Houston
Houston
Houston Aeros seasons